Zhao Ji is the personal name of Emperor Huizong of Song.

Zhao Ji may also refer to:

 Marquess Lie of Zhao, ruler of the client state Zhao of Zhou dynasty
 Lady Zhao, the mother of China's first emperor, Qin Shi Huang
 Zhao Ji (athlete), Chinese paralympic athlete
 Zhao Ji (actress) (born 1987), Chinese actress